In enzymology, a 24-methylenesterol C-methyltransferase is an enzyme that catalyzes the chemical reaction

S-adenosyl-L-methionine + 24-methylenelophenol  S-adenosyl-L-homocysteine + (Z)-24-ethylidenelophenol

Thus, the two substrates of this enzyme are S-adenosyl methionine and 24-Methylenelophenol, whereas its two products are S-adenosylhomocysteine and (Z)-24-ethylidenelophenol.

This enzyme belongs to the family of transferases, specifically those transferring one-carbon group methyltransferases.  The systematic name of this enzyme class is S-adenosyl-L-methionine:24-methylenelophenol C-methyltransferase. Other names in common use include SMT2, and 24-methylenelophenol C-241-methyltransferase.  This enzyme participates in the biosynthesis of steroids.

References

 

EC 2.1.1
Enzymes of unknown structure